This article covers the history of London from the Norman conquest of England in 1066 to the late 15th century.

Norman invasion

The Norman invasion of Britain in 1066 is usually considered to be the beginning of a new era in English history. William, Duke of Normandy, defeated English king Harold Godwinson at the Battle of Hastings. Having conquered Hampshire and Kent, William and his army turned to London. Having failed to cross London bridge at Southwark, William's army marched clockwise around London and waited to the north-west at Berkhamsted. Where, having realised that resistance was pointless, a delegation from London arrived to surrender the city, and recognise William as King. William soon granted a charter for London in 1067 which upheld previous Saxon rights, privileges and laws. 
Under William (now known as William the Conqueror) several royal forts were constructed along the riverfront of London (the Tower of London, Baynard's Castle and Montfichet's Castle) to defend against seaborne attacks by Vikings and prevent rebellions. Its growing self-government became firm with election rights granted by King John in 1199 and 1215.

Buildings

In 1097 William Rufus, the third son of William I of England (William the Conqueror) began the construction of Westminster Hall. The hall was to become the basis of the Palace of Westminster which, throughout the Medieval period, was the prime royal residence. In 1089/90 William had given the royal manor of Bermondsey for the site of Bermondsey Abbey, founded in 1082 by Alwinus Child, a citizen of London. The new abbey thus lay directly across the Thames from the White Tower, then still under construction. In 1123 the Augustinian Priory Church of St Bartholomew-the-Great was founded at West Smithfield in the City of London. Whilst only the chancel of this once large church now survives, as a parish church, the entire nave having been demolished, it is one of the most important remnants of Norman architecture in London.

In 1176 construction began of the most famous incarnation of London Bridge (completed in 1209) which was built on the site of several earlier wooden bridges. This bridge would last for 600 years, and remained the only bridge across the River Thames until 1739.

War and revolt
London was a centre of England's Jewish population. Violence against Jews took place in 1190, after it was rumoured that the new King had ordered their massacre after they had presented themselves at his coronation.

May 1216 saw the last time that London was truly occupied by a continental armed force, during the First Barons' War. This was when the young Louis VIII of France marched through the streets to St Paul's Cathedral. Throughout the city and in the cathedral he was celebrated as the new ruler.

It was expected that this would free the English from the tyranny of King John. This was only temporarily true. The barons supporting the 29-year-old French prince decided to throw their support back to an English king when John died. Over the next several hundred years, London would shake off the heavy French cultural and linguistic influence which had been there since the times of the Norman conquest. The city, like Dover, would figure heavily into the development of Early Modern English.

In 1264 during the Second Barons' War, Simon de Montfort's rebels occupied London and killed 500 Jews while attempting to seize records of debts.

London's Jewish community was forced to leave England by the expulsion by Edward I in 1290. They left for France, Holland and further afield; their property was seized, and many suffered robbery and murder as they departed.

During the Peasants' Revolt of 1381 led by Wat Tyler, London was invaded. A group of peasants stormed the Tower of London and executed the Lord Chancellor, Archbishop Simon Sudbury, and the Lord Treasurer. The peasants looted the city and set fire to numerous buildings. Tyler was stabbed to death by the Lord Mayor William Walworth in a confrontation at Smithfield, thus ending the revolt.

During the Wars of the Roses there was strong support in London for the Yorkist cause. The Lancastrian Henry VI was forced to leave London for the Midlands in 1456 due to hostile attitudes in the capital. He was later captured and kept for five years in the Tower of London. London was eventually captured by the Yorkist Edward IV in 1471, and Henry murdered. This established the Yorkist claim on the throne and ended the first phase of the Wars of the Roses.

Capital of England
In the early Middle Ages, England had no fixed capital per se; Kings moved from place to place taking their court with them. The closest thing to a capital was Winchester where the royal treasury and financial records were stored. This changed from about 1200 when these were moved to Westminster. From this point on, Royal government became increasingly centered upon Westminster, which steadily became the de facto capital.

In the Middle Ages, Westminster was a small town up river from the City of London. From the 13th century onwards London grew up in two different parts. Westminster became the Royal capital and centre of government, whereas the City of London became the centre of commerce and trade, a distinction which is still evident to this day. The area between them became entirely urbanised by 1600.

Trade and commerce

Trade and commerce grew steadily during the Middle Ages, and London grew rapidly as a result. In 1100 London's population was little more than 15,000. By 1300 it had grown to roughly 80,000. Trade in London was organised into various guilds, which effectively controlled the city, and elected the Lord Mayor of London.

Fire and plague

Medieval London was made up of narrow and twisting streets, and most of the buildings were made from combustible materials such as wood and straw, which made fire a constant threat. Sanitation in London was poor. London lost at least half of its population during the Black Death in the mid-14th century. Between 1348 and the Great Plague of 1666 there were sixteen outbreaks of plague in the city.  In 1666, the Great Fire gutted much of London within the city wall.

References

External links
Medieval London.History of world cities
Reassessing what we collect website – Norman London History of Norman London with objects and images
A Chronicle of London from 1089 to 1483

See also
History of London
Britain in the Middle Ages

History of London by period
London